The Kenner Town Hall is a historic building in Kenner, Louisiana. It was built in 1925 by J.E. Louviere, and it was the city hall until 1956. It was later used as a courthouse and a jail, and offices for Kenner's tourism department. It has been listed on the National Register of Historic Places since January 23, 1986.

References

National Register of Historic Places in Jefferson Parish, Louisiana
Government buildings completed in 1925
1925 establishments in Louisiana